Chanelle Charron-Watson (born June 13, 1984 in Gatineau, Quebec) is a female swimmer from Canada, who took three silver relay medals at the 2007 Pan American Games in Rio de Janeiro, Brazil.

References
Profile Canadian Olympic Committee

1984 births
Living people
Canadian female freestyle swimmers
Sportspeople from Gatineau
Swimmers at the 2007 Pan American Games
Pan American Games silver medalists for Canada
Pan American Games medalists in swimming
Universiade medalists in swimming
Universiade bronze medalists for Canada
Laval Rouge et Or athletes
Medalists at the 2005 Summer Universiade
Medalists at the 2007 Pan American Games